Dena Hankins (born 1975) is an American novelist and short story author, best known for queer and transgender erotic romance. Her short stories have been published in several erotica anthologies, including Best Lesbian Romance of the Year 2015 edited by Radclyffe.

Hankins' work is part of a growing trend to feature queer romance that is outside of the "issues" books that were once more common. Publishers Weekly called her novel Blue Water Dreams, featuring a love story between a queer cisgender woman and a transgender man, an "exciting debut", and Lambda Literary Review included Blue Water Dreams among "new and noteworthy" LGBT books. Literary blog Out in Print: Queer Book Reviews chose Blue Water Dreams for inclusion in its "Best of 2014" top ten list. The American Library Association found her book to be "well within the expectations of the romance genre, albeit with an aypical male lead."

Hankins' second novel, Heart of the Lilikoi, features an erotic romance between a cisgender lesbian construction contractor and a masculine genderqueer solar energy scientist in the midst of sabotage, murder, and the Hawaiian sovereignty movement. Publishers Weekly called Heart of the Lilikoi an "intriguing contemporary", "strong and satisfying" with "intensely vivid erotic encounters".

Lysistrata Cove, published in September 2016, is a romance within a tale of high seas adventure while examining questions of artistic autonomy within the U.S. music industry. It includes a BDSM relationship between a trans masculine sea captain and a polyamorous queer superstar chanteuse.

Personal life
Hankins studied English literature at the University of Washington Seattle, graduating with a bachelor's degree in 1998. The following year she bought a boat with her partner, photographer James Lane, and began living aboard full-time. The couple sailed their small craft from Seattle to San Francisco, then across the Pacific Ocean to Hawaii. After a year living in Kerala, India, they returned to the United States to purchase a new sailing vessel and traveled the East Coast of the United States from Virginia to Maine. A Cruising Editor for The Waterway Guide, Hankins is certified to sail and charter intracostal waterways with a 50-ton Master License by the United States Coast Guard. Hankins chronicled her "Around the World in 80 Years" traveling adventures as well as pieces from her growing body of literary work at her blog, Sovereign Nations.

Before launching her writing career Hankins worked for eight years as a sex educator with Babeland, a Seattle-based feminist sex toy store. In 2001 she was featured on HBO's Real Sex #26 as a demo model for a Babeland cunnilingus workshop.

Bibliography
Novels:
Blue Water Dreams published by Bold Strokes Books (September 2014)
Heart of the Lilikoi published by Bold Strokes Books (October 2015)
Lysistrata Cove published by Bold Strokes Books (October 2016)

Short Story Fiction:
"The Battle of Blair Mountain" in Thunder of War, Lightning of Desire: Lesbian Military Historical Erotica, edited by Sacchi Green (October 2015)
"Cooling Down, Heating Up" in Love Burns Bright: A Lifetime of Lesbian Romance, and in Best Lesbian Romance of the Year 2015 both edited by Radclyffe (October 2013/February 2015)
"Drag" in Best Women's Erotica of the Year volume 8, edited by Rachel Kramer Bussel (December 2022)
"Gift" in Come Again: Sex Toy Erotica, edited by Rachel Kramer Bussel (March 2015)
"Goa" in Twice the Pleasure: Bisexual Women's Erotica, edited by Rachel Kramer Bussel (April 2013), and in "Breathless: Steamy Sexy Short Stories", edited by Roger Leatherwood (March 2015) 
"Hold On Harder" in Best Bondage Erotica of the Year volume 1, edited by Rachel Kramer Bussel (March 2020)
"Floating in Space" in Girl Fever: 69 Stories of Sudden Sex for Lesbians, edited by Sacchi Green (June 2012)
"Mojave" in Best Lesbian Erotica of the Year volume 2, edited by Rachel Kramer Bussel (March 2020)
"Obey" in Dancing with Myself, edited by Jillian Boyd (February 2018)
"Symphony" in Begging For It: Female Fantasy Erotica, edited by Rachel Kramer Bussel (July 2016)
"Teamwork" in Me and My Boi: Queer Erotic Stories, edited by Sacchi Green (September 2015)

References

External links

Out in Print: Queer Book Reviews "Best of 2014"
Hankins Reading "Cooling Down, Heating Up" on the Liz McMullen Show 
Author Page at Bold Strokes Books: Dena Hankins
Sailing Blog: Sovereign Nations
Photography by James Lane: Sovereign Nations
Sexlife Canada Review  of Twice the Pleasure: Bisexual Women's Erotica
Interview with Dena Hankins about writing Blue Water Dreams

21st-century American novelists
21st-century American short story writers
American women novelists
American women short story writers
American short story writers
1975 births
Living people
American erotica writers
Queer writers
American LGBT novelists
University of Washington College of Arts and Sciences alumni
Women erotica writers
21st-century American women writers
21st-century LGBT people